James P. Axiotis is an American film and television producer, director and writer who is known for his work on The Bridges of Madison County, The Puppet Master, Hell's Kitchen, Cold Case Files, and more.

Early life and career 
James was born in Athens Greece and got adopted by Greek Americans and was moved to Southern California. After finishing his graduation, Axiotis started working as an executive producer and director. Axiotis has worked on a multitude of feature film credits and TV shows including The Bridges of Madison County, Marriage Boot Camp, Reality Stars, The Postman Always Rings Twice, The Puppet Master, Hell's Kitchen, America's Most Wanted, Cold Case Files, Table for One and NBC Nightly News. From past 6 years, Axiotis has served in the capacity of Vice President of Post-production and Post-Producer at AT&T/Audience Network. Axiotis is in his second term serving on the National Board of directors for the Producers Guild of America and a member of The Producers Guild of Europe, the Academy of Television Arts & Sciences, American Film Institute, The Greek American Foundation, and the Order of AHEPA.

Filmography 

 The Bridges of Madison County
 The Puppet Master
365 Days of Love
 The Postman Always Rings Twice
 Hell's Kitchen
Marriage Boot Camp: Reality Stars
Home Free
 America's Most Wanted
Table for One
Me & Mrs. C
 Cold Case Files
Cooper's Treasure
 Home Free
Hacking the Wild
1ndustry
 American Grit

References

External links 
 https://smileymovement.org/news-list/James-Axiotis
 
 https://wearethecity.com/heforshe-james-axiotis-film-producer/

American film producers
Living people
1963 births
People from Athens